"Sherlock (Clue + Note)" is a song recorded by South Korean boy band Shinee as the lead single for their fourth extended play, Sherlock. It was released on March 19, 2012, through SM Entertainment. A mashup of two different tracks, "Sherlock (Clue + Note)" is often considered K-pop's first "hybrid remix". It was written and produced by Thomas Troelsen, Rufio Sandilands, Rocky Morris and Thomas Eriksen, with lyrics penned by Jo Yoon-kyung. The song was commercially successful, reaching number one on the Gaon Digital Chart. A Japanese version was released on May 16, 2012.

Background and release
"Sherlock (Clue + Note)" was Shinee's first Korean single since "Hello" (2010), following a year's absence due to touring and Japanese promotions. It was released on March 19, 2012, alongside the rest of the EP. Shinee promoted the song for four weeks, beginning with an appearance on March 22 on M Countdown. A Japanese version, titled "Sherlock", was released on May 16, 2012, with the song "Keeping Love Again" as a B-side. It was later included on Shinee's second Japanese album, Boys Meet U.

Composition
"Sherlock (Clue + Note)" is the combination of two separate album tracks spliced together: "Clue" and "Note". It is credited as K-pop's first ever "hybrid remix". "Clue" forms the "bulk of the instrumentation", and has been described as both new jack swing and hip hop. It features "a beat made out of a digitized kettle, little spurts of brass, and the recurring sound of shattered glass". In contrast, "Note" is "striding, percussive" and vocal-driven. It features most prominently in the "incendiary" chorus, which is carried by explosive harmonies. The beginning of the song also incorporates "soaring strings" that later reappeared in Shinee's 2013 song "Spoiler". The lyrics contain a Sherlock Holmes theme; the Sherlock character depicted in the song uses the reason of "Clue" and intuition of "Note" to solve a case.

Critical reception
"Sherlock (Clue + Note)" received generally positive reviews from music critics. Rolling Stone cited it as an example of "how innovative and experimental K-pop can get, even for its most mainstream acts". They twice named it one of the greatest boy band songs of all time, first in 2015 and again in 2020. Writing for Dazed, Taylor Glasby praised the song's complexity and the "confrontational energy" of Shinee's performance. She said that it "signalled a coming of age for the band" and "allowed Shinee to step into a sphere that was entirely their own". According to Billboard, ""Sherlock"" places a magnifying glass over the ways the Korean industry’s innovation is pushing music forward". They named it one of the best K-pop songs of the 2010s.

Commercial performance
"Sherlock (Clue + Note)" debuted at number one on the weekly Gaon Digital Chart. It also peaked at number three on the K-pop Hot 100. The song recorded 1,720,124 downloads in South Korea in 2012, ranking at number 74 on the year-end Gaon Download Chart. It also placed 81st on the year-end Gaon Digital Chart. In the U.S., it reached number four on Billboard World Digital Song Sales and charted for ten weeks. As of December 2017, "Sherlock (Clue + Note)" has received 30,000 downloads in the U.S., making it Shinee's fourth best-selling single in the country.

Music video
The music video was filmed in early March in Namyangju and was directed by Cho Su-hyun. It is set in a museum and shows the members taking on the role of detectives solving a case. Jessica of Girls' Generation makes an appearance as the mysterious female lead. A teaser for the music video was uploaded to SM Entertainment's social media accounts on March 21, followed by the music video's release on March 22. It received over a million views in one day.

The choreography was created by Tony Testa. It was his first time choreographing for a K-pop group. Testa tried to "create the illusion" that the members were "alone, retracing memories, their blurred bodies trailing behind as if trying to piece together their lives".

Credits and personnel
Credits adapted from Melon.

 Shinee – vocals
 Jo Yoon-kyung – lyrics
 Thomas Troelsen – composition, production
 Rufio Sandilands – composition, production
 Rocky Morris – composition, production
 Thomas Eriksen – composition, production

Charts

Korean version

Japanese version

Accolades

Release history

References

2012 singles
2012 songs
Korean-language songs
Shinee songs
SM Entertainment singles
Gaon Digital Chart number-one singles
Songs written by Thomas Troelsen